Apportionment is a legal term for distribution or allotment in proper shares.

Apportionment may also refer to:

Biology
Niche apportionment models of relative species abundance distributions

Law
Uniform Apportionment of Tort Responsibility Act, a Uniform Act drafted by the National Conference of Commissioners on Uniform State Laws (NCCUSL) 
Formulary apportionment, a method of allocating corporate taxation between jurisdictions

Mathematics
 Fair division, in game theory
 Apportionment paradox, various paradoxical proofs in political apportionment

Politics and government
Apportionment (politics), the process of allocating the power of a set of constituent voters among their political representatives
Biproportional apportionment
Apportionment of votes in a proposed United Nations Parliamentary Assembly

Europe
Apportionment in the European Parliament
National apportionment of MP seats in the Riksdag (Swedish national legislature)

United States
United States congressional apportionment
Apportionment (OMB), distribution of US government funds
New Jersey Apportionment Commission
Ohio Apportionment Board